A list of films produced in Argentina in 1964:

External links and references
 Argentine films of 1964 at the Internet Movie Database

1964
Argentine
Films